Andy Grant (born May 7, 1984) is a retired middle distance runner from Saint Vincent and the Grenadines. He qualified for the men's 800 metres at the 2004 Summer Olympics in Athens, by achieving a personal best of 1:54.53 from the NACAC Championships in Sherbrooke, Canada. Grant threw down a time of 1:57.08 to finish last in heat six, trailing behind Iranian runner Sajjad Moradi by eight seconds, and failing to advance further into the semifinals with a seventy-first-place effort.

References

External links

1984 births
Living people
Saint Vincent and the Grenadines male middle-distance runners
Olympic athletes of Saint Vincent and the Grenadines
Athletes (track and field) at the 2004 Summer Olympics